The 1943 Mazatlán hurricane was a powerful tropical cyclone (at least Category 4) that lashed the southern coast of Sinaloa on the morning of 9 October 1943.  The hurricane went essentially undetected before it made landfall just south of Mazatlán on 9 October with a pressure below  and maximum sustained winds of at least . The hurricane destroyed two small towns and half of Mazatlán, killing at least 106 persons, injuring 102, and leaving over 1,000 homeless. Total damage was estimated at $4.5 million (1943 USD, $56 million 2008 USD). The hurricane was the strongest on record to strike Mazatlán.

Meteorological history

Sources do not reveal the exact origin of this tropical cyclone.  On 8 October, a developing tropical cyclone passed between the Revillagigedo Islands and Islas Marías. It moved rapidly northeastward and arrived on the coast of Sinaloa as an intense hurricane.

At 1530 UTC 9 October, the hurricane made landfall just south of Mazatlán. The hurricane ranks as the strongest on record to strike the city.

The storm dropped little precipitation as it passed Mazatlán, but  fell on the afternoon of 9 October.

As the storm continued inland, it rapidly weakened and apparently dissipated over the Sierra Madre Occidental. The storm apparently passed into Chihuahua and was predicted to continue into the southern United States, though the remainder of its path is unknown.

The cyclone dissipated over the state of Durango within a day after landfall.  Heavy rain developed across parts of Texas on 12/13 October 1943.

Effects and aftermath 

Moving ashore as a powerful hurricane, the storm destroyed the small towns of El Roble, now in Mazatlán Municipality, and Palmillas.  The storm partially destroyed Villa Unión (a town now in Mazatlán Municipality) and severely damaged the port at Mazatlán.  In these towns, approximately 100 persons lost their lives. Though the storm was reported to have struck "without warning", most residents in the destroyed cities ably reached safety in higher ground. The hurricane destroyed about half of the buildings in Mazatlán, and near the ocean, the combination of strong waves, high winds, and rainfall heavily damaged many hotels and houses. The storm damaged water systems, leaving people without potable water or sewage systems. In a  portion of the coastline, the storm severely impacted the communication and transportation infrastructure. The airport at Mazatlán sustained damage to its radio tower, and for at least 18 hours, the only communication between the city and the rest of Mexico was through the radio of a plane in the airport. Total damage was estimated at $4.5 million (1943 USD, $56 million 2008 USD).

Of several fishing boats and a small Mexican Navy vessel caught in the storm, no trace reportedly was found; all persons aboard these vessels apparently died.  A small coastal boat arrived in the port of Mazatlán after the storm and reported six crew members missing.

Within two days after the storm, the death toll rose to 18; the next day, the Associated Press reported 52 deaths and 102 injuries. Ten days after the storm, military officials reported the death toll rose to 57, and the number of people left homeless by the storm reached over 1,000.

By 24 hours after the storm,  President Manuel Ávila Camacho ordered nurses and doctors on standby, and for military workers in the area to prepare to assist in the aftermath. By five days after the storm, officials had restored power and communications in the area. Around the same time, the president issued an appeal for public donations for storm victims. Within a week, citizens sent large quantities of food, clothing, and medicine to the worst affected areas. The President of Mexico personally visited Mazatlán with other officials, bringing aid in the form of medicine and clothing.

Comparison
However, Hurricane Tico (1983) moved ashore very near the city as a major hurricane.

See also

1959 Mexico hurricane

References

1940s Pacific hurricane seasons
Category 4 Pacific hurricanes
1943 natural disasters
1943 meteorology
Hurricanes in Sinaloa